Stefan Hakenberg is a composer.  He was born in Wuppertal, Germany, and currently lives in Juneau, Alaska. Reviewers have praised his music as "highly original," "dramatic and memorable," "creating strong musical expressions in a densely contrapuntal style."  The integration of players of non-western classical background has particularly shaped Hakenberg's creative thought.  His work is an ongoing reflection on musical styles of today that he finds along an international career path that has taken him from Cologne in the 80s to Boston in the 90s to Seoul at the turn of the millennium.

Stefan Hakenberg counts Hans Werner Henze, Bernard Rands, Mario Davidovsky and Oliver Knussen amongst his teachers.  He studied at the Hochschule für Musik Köln and received his Ph.D. from Harvard University.

Stefan Hakenberg together with his wife, kayagum player Jocelyn Clark, founded the Alaskan contemporary music organization "CrossSound," which won an ASCAP-Chamber Music America Award for Adventurous Programming, and received an NEA Creativity Grant for a program including Hakenberg's pansori "Klanott and the Land Otter People."

Works 
 Klanott and the Land Otter People a Southeast Alaskan p'ansori, in a prologue and five scenes after a story by Brett Dillingham, text by Chan Eung Park for P'ansori-singer, 3 violins, clarinet, bass clarinet, horn, drum and Zheng (2005)
 Ein Gesang der Loreley for violin, alto flute and clarinet (in A) - (2004)
 It Lightens, It Brightens . . . for bass recorder, kayagûm, bass-koto and cello (2003)
 Der Nachmittag eines Gärtners for erhu, cello, recorder, accordion, kayagûm and marimba (2002)
 Small Craft for flute, violin, viola and euphonium (2001)
 Wild Landscape and Underbrush for wind quintet (2000)
 Sir Donald for cello, kayagûm, and changgu (1999)
 Three Zithers and a Pair of Scissors five montages for Koto, Kayagûm, changgu and zheng (1998)
 Bug Snatches Spider for violin, viola, cello, contrabass, flute, clarinet/bass clarinet, horn, percussion, and piano (1997)
 Cube for bass clarinet, drums and cello (1996)
 Drei Stücke for brass quintet (1994)
 Emergence for bass clarinet and percussion (1993)

Recordings
2008: S. Hakenberg: The Egg Musher - S. Taglietti: Memoirs of Elagabalus El Cimarrón Ensemble VDM Records

References
Theater.de article by Georg Etscheit about premiere of The Egg Musher 'Erste Oper über Klimawandel wird uraufgeführt' (10 July 2007), accessed 9 February 2010 (German)

External links
Composer's website, accessed 9 February 2010
Boston Modern Orchestra Project biographical page, accessed 9 February 2010
El Cimarron Ensemble page on Hakenberg's: The Egg Musher CD, accessed 9 February 2010
El Cimarron Ensemble page Video clips of Hakenberg's: The Egg Musher, accessed 9 February 2010

American male composers
21st-century American composers
Living people
Harvard University alumni
German emigrants to the United States
Year of birth missing (living people)
21st-century American male musicians